Keep Searchin'  is an album by trombonist Steve Turre recorded in 2006 and released on the HighNote label.

Reception

On All About Jazz, Dan McCleneghan  observed "On Keep Searchin'  Turre pays tribute to his own musical/life philosophy on a set of forward-looking original (mostly) compositions, performed with a group of stellar musicians ... Turre mixes up the sound with different mutes throughout, and adds, again, the hollow, peacefully haunting timbre of the conch shell on the closing title track. An excellent set by an ever-searching artist".

In JazzTimes, David Whiteis stated "Turre and his bandmates take us on a journey that’s spiritually uplifting, to be sure, but also hard-swinging and, for the most part, ebulliently down-to-earth and joyful".

Track listing 
All compositions by Steve Turre except where noted
 "Sanyas" – 9:13
 "Faded Beauty" – 6:25
 "Thandiwa" (Grachan Moncur III) – 5:43
 "Reconcillation" – 6:50
 "Time Off" – 4:02
 "My Funny Valentine" (Richard Rodgers, Lorenz Hart) – 5:40	
 "Easy Now" – 7:45
 "Steppin' Out" – 4:53
 "Da Blues" – 5:44
 "Keep Searchin'" – 7:11

Personnel 
Steve Turre – trombone, shells
Stefon Harris - vibraphone 
Akua Dixon – baritone violin (tracks 1, 2 & 4)
Xavier Davis – piano
Gerald Cannon (tracks 5-9), Peter Washington (tracks 1-4 & 10) - bass
Dion Parson – drums

References 

Steve Turre albums
2006 albums
HighNote Records albums
Albums recorded at Van Gelder Studio